Dr. Sheikh Abdur Rehman (Urdu) (4 June 1903 – 25 July 1990) was the 5th Chief Justice of Pakistan. He did his MA from University of Punjab, BA Hons from Oxford and Ph.D. in Law from Cairo.

Abdur-Rehman entered Indian Civil Services in 1926. He served in the capacity of Assistant Commissioner and District and Sessions Judge in various Districts of Punjab. He was appointed as Judge Lahore High Court in 1946. He graduated from Islamia College Lahore.

In 1947, he was appointed as the Member of Bengal Boundary Commission. From 1947-52 he acted as the Custodian of Evacuee Property Punjab. Abdur-Rehman remained the vice-chancellor of Punjab University Lahore from 1950 to 1952. He became the Chief Justice of Lahore High Court in 1954. He was elevated as the Chief Justice West Pakistan High Court in 1955. In 1958 he was made the Judge, Supreme Court of Pakistan. He replaced Justice A.R. Cornelius as the Chief Justice of Supreme Court of Pakistan. He retired as the Chief Justice on 3 June 1968. He also acted as Chief Election Commissioner in 1964, 1965, 1966, and 1967.

Besides his professional career he remained the Chairman Central Urdu Board Lahore, Director Institute of Islamic Culture, Lahore, Member Bazm-i-Iqal and the Board for the Advancement of Literature and President Pakistan Arts Council.

Books
Abdur-Rehman has also three books to his credit: 
Tarjuman-I-Israr (an Urdu translation in verse of Iqbal's Israr-I-Khudi), 
Safar a collection of Urdu poems, and 
Punishment Of Apostasy in Islam (1972). In this latter work Rahman is one of a number of voices working from within the Islamic tradition who seek to reinterpret scriptural texts, and reform the scriptural reading  of blasphemy and apostasy laws.

See also
Chief Justices of Pakistan
Supreme Court of Pakistan

References

1903 births
1990 deaths
People from Wazirabad
Chief justices of Pakistan
Indian Civil Service (British India) officers
Pakistani judges
University of the Punjab alumni
Vice-Chancellors of the University of the Punjab
Government Islamia College alumni
Indian expatriates in the United Kingdom
Indian expatriates in Egypt